Talyzin is a masculine surname, its feminine counterpart is Talyzina. Notable people with the surname include:

Nikolai Talyzin (1929–1991), Soviet statesman and economist 
Valentina Talyzina (born 1935), Russian film and stage actress

Russian-language surnames